The Bhatiara are a Pashtun community found in North India.

History and origin
The Bhatiara are the traditional innkeepers of North India. They enjoyed royal patronage in running inns all along the trade routes in India. The community trace their descent from Salim Shah, a brother the Sher Shah Suri, the last Afghan ruler of North India. After the overthrow of the Suri dynasty, members of the royal family were forced into the lowly occupation of inn-keeping by the vengeful Mughals. Although claiming to be Pathan, their clans reveal a heterogeneous origin. Their main clans are the Bahlim, Bhil, Chauhan, Chriyamar, Jalkhatri, Madariya, Muderi, Sidiqui, Nanbai, Shirazi and Sulaimani.

Present circumstances
The Bhatiara are no longer involved in their traditional occupation of inn-keeping. Most are now wage labourers, or involved in driving ekkas, a traditional horse-drawn cart. Many are also sharecroppers, renting out land from other communities. This decline in their occupation has also led the disappearance of their caste council. The community were historically Sunni of the Barelvi disposition, but many now belong to the Deobandi or Ahle Hadith sects.

The community is dispersed all along the Grand Trunk Road, but are concentrated in Allahabad and Fatehpur. The community speaks Awadhi, but many are shifting to Urdu. They perceive themselves to be of Shaikh status, but this claim is not accepted by other recognized Shaikh groups, such as the Muslim Kayasths and Milkis. A significant minority of Bhatiaras have also emigrated to Pakistan, where they form an important element in the Muhajir community.

In Bihar, according to their traditions, the ruler Salim Shah Suri settled them along the Grand Trunk Road as inn-keepers. They speak the Magadhi dialect and are found mainly in central Bihar. The community are strictly endogamous, with virtually no cases of inter-marriage with other communities. They are essentially an urban community, with many being petty traders. The Bhatiara have now opened tea-stalls, sweet-shops and paan shops. They are some of the more successful Bihari Muslim communities, and many have now taken to education. Bhatiyara farooqi are different caste from Farooqui because they are descendants of Umar farooq second khalifa of Islam. The community have a statewide caste association, the Farooq Jamat, which deals with community welfare.

In Awadh, during the Nawabi Awadh era when Tehsin Ali Khan Khwajasara built his serai at Chowk, he arranged to settle them there, in order to take care of the serai occupants.

Bhatiara of Rajasthan 

In Rajasthan, the Bhatiara claim Persian descent, and according to their traditions, they arrived with the Mughal armies that invaded Rajasthan in the 16th century. The Bhattiara were assigned duties to maintain inns by the Mughal authorities in the conquered towns. They are still distributed in these towns such as Alwar, Bharatpur. The community either speak Marwari or Shaikhawati, depending on where they live. Most also understand Urdu. 

Like other Muslim groups in Rajasthan, the Bhatiara are strictly endogamous, preferring to marry close kin. They maintain a distance from neighbouring Musllim communities such as the Meo, Kunjra, Kasia and Hajjam. The Bhattiara occupy distinct quarters within the towns they are found in.

The Bhatiara are still involved in their traditional occupation of inn keeping. Many of their establishment also sell food to a Muslim clientele. The Bhattiara have a permanent economic relations with the Meo and Qaimkhanis, and receive payment in cereal from these two communities. A large number of Bhatiara are now employed as wage labourers, with a small number emigrating to the Persian Gulf region for employment.

Like other Muslim occupational castes, each Bhatiara settlement contains an informal caste known as a biradari panchayat. Almost disputes are referred to the panchayat, including cases of adultery and theft.

See also
Shaikhs in South Asia
Saifi
Manihar
Momin Ansari

References

Muhajir communities
Shaikh clans
Muslim communities of Uttar Pradesh
Muslim communities of Rajasthan
Pashtun tribes
Muslim communities of Bihar